Znamensky (from знамя meaning flag, banner) is a Russian masculine surname, its feminine counterpart is Znamenskaya. It may refer to
Alexander Znamensky (1877–1928), Russian wrestler.
Georgy Znamensky (1903–1946), Russian runner
Mikhail Znamensky (1833–1892), Russian writer, memoirist, painter, caricaturist, archeologist and ethnographer
Seraphim Znamensky (1906–1942), Russian runner, brother of Georgy

Russian-language surnames